Davie Mathie (15 August 1919 – 3 January 1954) was a Scottish footballer who played as a centre forward.

Mathie played for Motherwell (two spells), Clyde, Partick Thistle, Llanelli, Kilmarnock and Workington.

References

1919 births
1954 deaths
Footballers from Motherwell
Association football forwards
Scottish footballers
Larkhall Thistle F.C. players
Wishaw Juniors F.C. players
Motherwell F.C. players
Hibernian F.C. wartime guest players
Dumbarton F.C. wartime guest players
Linfield F.C. wartime guest players
Clyde F.C. players
Partick Thistle F.C. players
Llanelli Town A.F.C. players
Kilmarnock F.C. players
Workington A.F.C. players
Scottish Football League players
Scottish Junior Football Association players
English Football League players